USS Quillback (SS-424), a Tench-class submarine, was the only ship of the United States Navy to be named for quillback, a fish of the sucker family, widespread in the freshwaters of North America and Northern Asia.

Construction
When her construction by the Portsmouth Navy Yard in Kittery, Maine, was authorized, her name was to be Trembler, which would have made her the first ship named for the trembler, a torpedinoid fish of the West Indies and Brazil, but she was given a less embarrassing name on 7 December 1943.

Her keel was laid down on 27 June 1944.  She was launched on 1 October 1944 sponsored by Mrs. J. A. Tyree, Jr., and commissioned on 29 December 1944.

Wartime Activities
After training at New London, Connecticut, and work on an experimental ordnance project at Key West, Florida, Quillback departed for Pearl Harbor and her maiden war patrol, off the coast of Kyūshū. During this patrol, from 30 May to 24 July 1945, she destroyed a Japanese suicide motorboat and rescued one aviator from the water only a half mile from the heavily armed shore. Surrender of the enemy found Quillback refitting for her second patrol at Guam.

Training Activities
Peacetime duties returned Quillback to New London for duty as a unit of Submarine Squadron 2. From 1945 to 1951, she operated with the Submarine School in a training capacity and as an experimental unit of the Naval Underwater Sound Laboratory. In April 1951, Quillback departed New London for a six-month tour of duty with the Sixth Fleet in the Mediterranean Sea. In April 1952, she reported to the Portsmouth Naval Shipyard for decommissioning and conversion.

On 27 February 1953, Quillback was recommissioned and joined the Submarine Force, Atlantic Fleet as a streamlined Greater Underwater Propulsive Power Program (GUPPY) Submarine. She reported to ComSubRon 4 at Key West. There in local operations, with occasional trips to Guantanamo Bay, she assisted the Fleet Training Group in Destroyer ASW indoctrination. In 1956, 1957, and 1958, Quillback took part in major fleet and NATO exercises in the North Atlantic.

Mediterranean Deployment
In 1959, Quillback was transferred to Submarine Squadron 12. In June 1959, the Quillback sailed the St. Lawrence River, traversed locks, and navigated all of the Great Lakes to reach Chicago in Operation Inland Seas to mark the official opening of the St. Lawrence Seaway. During 1960, she underwent extensive overhaul at Charleston, South Carolina, to improve her offensive capabilities. She deployed to the Mediterranean in October 1961, returning to Key West in February 1962. Operating locally out of Key West from May to October, Quillback was deployed to Guantanamo Bay when the Cuban Quarantine was put into effect and remained there during the first ten days of the Cuban Missile Crisis. During 1963, Quillback operated out of Key West and rendered services to the Fleet Training Group at Guantanamo.

Quillback deployed to the Mediterranean for six months in July 1964. Experimental torpedo research and development projects were assigned to Quillback in 1965 until she deployed to Guantanamo Bay in June. She continued to operate out of Key West until deploying to the Mediterranean again from August to November 1967. She spent most of 1968 and 1969 in the Caribbean.

[1970-1973]

Stricken from the Naval Vessel Register on 23 March 1973, Quillback was sold on 21 March 1974.

Honors and awards
Quillback earned one battle star for World War II service.

References 

Tench-class submarines
World War II submarines of the United States
Cold War submarines of the United States
Ships built in Kittery, Maine
1944 ships